"It's Your Duty" is a song by Norwegian singer Lene Nystrøm. It was released on 8 September 2003, as the lead single from her first and only album, Play with Me (2003). The song peaked at #3 in the Danish charts.

Track listing

 UK CD single
 "It's Your Duty" (Album Version) - 3:06
 "It's Your Duty" (Mark Picchiotti Remix) - 7:30

 UK CD promo (LENE 2; Released: July, 2003)
 "It's Your Duty" - 3:06

 UK 12" vinyl promo
A1. "It's Your Duty" (Mark Picchiotti Remix) - 7:30
B1. "It's Your Duty" (Bimbo Jones Dub) - 6:19

 Europe and Japan CD single
 "It's Your Duty" – 3:06
 "Queen for a Day" – 3:26
 "It's Your Duty" (Mark Picchiotti Remix) – 7:30
 "It's Your Duty" (Enhanced Video) – 3:06

 Europe & Japan promo CD
 "It's Your Duty" - 3:06

Charts

Release history

References

2003 singles
2003 songs
Songs written by Karen Poole
Songs written by Lucas Secon
Songs written by Lene Nystrøm